The 2011 Montana State Bobcats football team represented Montana State University as a member of the Big Sky Conference during the 2011 NCAA Division I FCS football season. Led by fifth-year head coach Rob Ash, the Bobcats compiled an overall record of 10–3 with a mark of 7–1 in conference place play, sharing the Big Sky title with Montana. Montana vacated its share of the title on July 26, 2013 after the NCAA determined that Montana had played its final six games with ineligible players. Montana State received an at-large bid to the NCAA Division I Football Championship playoffs, where they defeated New Hampshire in the second round before falling to Sam Houston State in the quarterfinals. The Bobcats played their home games at Bobcat Stadium in Bozeman, Montana/

Schedule

References

Montana State
Montana State Bobcats football seasons
Big Sky Conference football champion seasons
Montana State
Montana State Bobcats football